Hudson Jeans is a US-based premium denim manufacturer.

History
Hudson Jeans was founded in 2002 by Peter Kim with its base in Los Angeles, California. Till date, Ben Taverniti has been the Creative Director/Designer of the brand.

In 2009, Fireman Capital Partners took a majority stake in Hudson Jeans. Reebok founder; Paul Fireman and his son, Dan; were at the head of the investment fund during the period.

In 2013, Joe’s Jeans brand signed an agreement to acquire Hudson Jeans for the sum of 97.6 million dollars. Hudson Jeans' CEO; Peter Kim remained as head of the company and also became a member of the board of directors at Joe’s Jeans.

Products and services
Hudson Jeans offers denim line of designer jeans with trademark triangular back pockets, and a Union Jack logo. Customers known to wear Hudson Jeans include Cara Delevingne and Britney Spears. Hudson Jeans also worked with Georgia May Jagger as one of the brand's model.

See also
 Jeans
 Designer clothing

References

External links
 

Clothing companies established in 2002
Manufacturing companies based in Los Angeles
2002 establishments in California
Companies that filed for Chapter 11 bankruptcy in 2020